Tsetsegjargal Tseden is an associate professor in the Department of Anthropology and Archaeology at the National University of Mongolia and a member of the Mongolian National Committee for UNESCO's Social Change Management Programme. She is known best for her research on gender issues in Mongolia.

Career
Tsetsegjargal completed her BA at the National University of Mongolia in 1998. She went on to complete her MA and PhD degrees in 1999 and 2009, respectively. Whilst reading for her MA, she started teaching gender studies courses, which she continued on becoming associate professor.

In 2006, she founded the Center for Gender Studies, and since 2019 she has participated in the Mongolian National Committee for UNESCO's Social Change Management Programme.

Honours
In 2016, Tsetsegjargal was honoured as a leading educator by the Ministry of Education, Culture and Science of Mongolia.

Publications

References

Living people
Year of birth missing (living people)
Mongolian women academics
Mongolian archaeologists
Women anthropologists
National University of Mongolia alumni